The Green Party of Hawai'i (GPH) is the green party organization in the state of Hawaii, and an affiliate organization of the Green Party of the United States.

The party's focus includes environmental issues, community-based economics, personal responsibility, diversity, social justice, and non-violence.

History

The Hawaii Green Party first qualified for the ballot in May 1992, one of the earliest state Green Parties to do so.

In November 1992, Keiko Bonk was elected to a seat on the Hawaii County (Big Island) County Council, the first Green to be elected in a partisan race in the United States.  She was re-elected in 1994, but stepped down to run unsuccessfully for Island Mayor in 1996.

In November 1998, Julie Jacobson was elected to Bonk's old seat on the Big Island, which she held upon re-election in 2000. Her campaign for election was managed by Bonk. When she decided not to run in 2002, her husband Bob Jacobson ran and was elected, then re-elected again in 2004 and 2006. Jacobson lost in 2008. No Green Party members have since held elected office in Hawaii.

In 2012, the Green Party of Hawaii was certified to be included on Hawaii partisan election ballots in all races through 2020. The party sued the Chief Election Officer Scott Nago as the state ran out of ballots on election day. A decision in the lawsuit was rendered by the Supreme Court of Hawaii on 19 July 2016.

See also
Aloha ʻĀina Party of Hawai'i
Democratic Party of Hawaii
Hawaii Republican Party

References

External links

Anti-capitalist political parties
Anti-imperialism in Oceania
Politics of Hawaii
Hawaii
Political parties in Hawaii
Environmental parties in Hawaii
 
Political parties established in 1992
1992 establishments in Hawaii
State and local socialist parties in the United States

sv:Green Party of the United States#Delstatspartier